Vladislavci is a municipality in Osijek-Baranja County, Croatia. There are 1,882 inhabitants, 83% of whom are Croats (2011 census). Vladislavci also have a significant Hungarian and Serbian community. Bobota Canal passes next to the village.

Name 
The name of the village in Croatian is plural.

References

Municipalities of Croatia